Beijing Olympic Broadcasting Co., Ltd (BOB) was a Chinese broadcasting consortium which produced the main international feeds for the 2008 Summer Olympics and 2008 Summer Paralympics. It was established in 2004 as a joint venture between the Beijing Organizing Committee for the Olympic Games and Olympic Broadcasting Services, owned by the International Olympic Committee, in such a way as to conform to Chinese laws against direct foreign investment in Chinese television.

History 

 May 27, 2004, Agreement Sign up of Funding BOB. BOB was put into track of establishment legally.
 Oct. 27, 2004, the first Board Meeting of Bob was held and BOB began its startup
 Nov 1, 2004, BOB began steering on.
 May 31, 2005, BOB launches officially to the public.
 May 31, 2005, 2nd board meeting was held.
 Sept 21–23, 2005 world broadcaster briefing held in Beijing.
 Sept 21, 2005 BOB signed MOU with China TV Production for Beijing Olympic Games.
 Sept 21, 2005 BOB signed MOU with China Netcom for Beijing Olympic Games.

See also
List of 2008 Summer Olympics broadcasters

References

 "Beijing Olympic Broadcasting." The Official Website of the Beijing 2008 Olympic Games. Web. 21 Oct. 2010. https://web.archive.org/web/20110809042239/http://en.beijing2008.cn/53/66/column211716653.shtml

External links
An Article On BOB on The Official Beijing 2008 Olympics Website
Official website

Television networks in China
2008 Summer Olympics
Mass media in Beijing